McKissick is a name and may refer to:

People

Surname 
 Floyd Bixler McKissick (1922–1991), American civil rights advocate and author
 Floyd Bixler McKissick, Jr. (born 1952), American lawyer and North Carolina State Senator
 Jaycen McKissick, punk rock musician with The Action Design and Pipedown
 Joe McKissack, one-time owner (1993–1999) of WEZZ radio in Monroeville, Alabama
 John McKissick (1926–2019), American high school football coach from South Carolina
 Norsalus McKissick (1923–1997), American gospel singer with The Roberta Martin Singers

Middle name 
 Thomas McKissick Jones (1816–1892), American politician in Tennessee
 Helen MacKissick Williamson (approx. 1904–1957), American headmistress in 1953 at Rosemary Hall prep school, Greenwich, Connecticut

Places 
 McKissick Museum, University of South Carolina

See also 
 McKissic
 McKissack (disambiguation)
 MacKessack (disambiguation)